Christine Carla Kangaloo (December 1961/January 1962) is a Trinidadian politician, who is the president of Trinidad and Tobago. She was president of the Senate of Trinidad and Tobago from 2015 until her resignation to run for president in 2023. She is the only person to serve as both President and Vice President of the Senate of Trinidad and Tobago, the first woman to serve as Senate Vice President and third woman to serve as acting President of Trinidad and Tobago and Senate President. She would also become the second woman to serve as President of Trinidad and Tobago, upon her assumption of office. Kangaloo has served as an Opposition Senator, Minister in the Office of the Prime Minister, Minister of Legal Affairs and Minister of Science, Technology and Tertiary Education in previous People's National Movement governments.

Biography

Christine Kangaloo was born into a Presbyterian Indo-Trinidadian family. She graduated from the University of the West Indies and Hugh Wooding Law School and with a degree in law. On 12 January 2001, she first became a member of parliament as an opposition senator under the tenure of Opposition Leader Patrick Manning. She then served as Vice President of the Senate and subsequently Minister in the Office of the Prime Minister in 2002. She was then appointed Minister of Legal Affairs in 2005. In the 2007 Trinidad and Tobago general election, she was elected to the House of Representatives as the People's National Movement (PNM) candidate for Pointe-à-Pierre and served as the Minister of Science, Technology and Tertiary Education. On 23 September 2015 she was elected as President of the Senate.

Notes

References

External links
 Parliamentary Profile , Trinidad and Tobago Parliament website

Members of the Senate (Trinidad and Tobago)
Members of the House of Representatives (Trinidad and Tobago)
Trinidad and Tobago politicians of Indian descent
Women government ministers of Trinidad and Tobago
Trinidad and Tobago women lawyers
University of the West Indies alumni
Year of birth missing (living people)
Living people
Presidents of the Senate (Trinidad and Tobago)
Presidents of Trinidad and Tobago
21st-century Trinidad and Tobago women politicians
21st-century Trinidad and Tobago politicians
People's National Movement politicians
Women legislative speakers
20th-century Trinidad and Tobago lawyers